Hawkesbury Village is a settlement in the Nuneaton and Bedworth district of Warwickshire, central England.

Village
Although part of Nuneaton and Bedworth district, its post town remains Coventry given the CV6 postcode. At its southern point the village borders the northernmost edge of Coventry and is separated from the city by a thin stretch of countryside and the M6 motorway, adjacent to Junction 3. It is situated within the Poplar Ward of the Nuneaton and Bedworth Borough Council area, less than 2 miles south of Bedworth town centre, 4.5 miles south of Nuneaton and 5 miles northwest of central Coventry.

Until around 1999, it consisted of three streets with approximately 140 houses and a population of 250. Housing developments have now increased the number of houses to approximately 740 with an adult population of 1,147.

This specific area has previously been referred to as a number of different locations, including Exhall, Longford, Tackley, Little Bayton and Black Horse Road. Due to these anomalies, it was felt that the area should be given a specific identity.

Towards the start of 2005, contact was made between Nuneaton and Bedworth Borough Council and Warwickshire County Council regarding signage for the area, which is defined as being between the Hawkesbury Lane railway crossing on Black Horse Road, where Hawkesbury Lane station used to be, and the humpback bridge over the Coventry Canal, alongside Hawkesbury Junction, where the Oxford Canal starts.

Following consultation, Warwickshire County Council reached the decision that this area should be known as Hawkesbury Village. The area includes the Moorings Business Park (adjacent to the south) though resident companies use Exhall/Coventry as their business address, not Hawkesbury.

The Member of Parliament for Hawkesbury Village is Craig Tracey (Conservative, North Warwickshire constituency), the borough councillors are Bhagwant Pandher and John Glass. The county councillor is Bhagwant Pandher, the first Conservative Councillor to represent this area in its history. It lies in the North Warwickshire parliamentary constituency.

In August 2005, the Hawkesbury Village Residents' Association was formed to act as a voice of the community and assist with local issues.

References

External links
 Hawkesbury Village Residents Association website
 Nuneaton and Bedworth Borough Council website
 Warwickshire County Council Website
 Photos of Hawkesbury and surrounding area on geograph.org.uk

Villages in Warwickshire